Mohsin Iqbal (born 30 September 1983) is an Indian cricketer. He is a right-handed batsman and a right-arm medium pace bowler who plays for Jammu and Kashmir.

Early life 
Iqbal was born in Doda.

Career 
Iqbal made a single appearance for Jammu and Kashmir Under-16s in 1999, and two seasons later, appeared twice for the Under-19s team. Iqbal made his debut first-class appearance for the senior team against Himachal Pradesh in November 2008. Iqbal has represented university of Bradford, England, UK as captain in the year 2006-2007 and has played for Westwood Cricket Club for one year in which he scored his maiden hundred against Buttershaw A.

References

1983 births
Living people
Indian cricketers
Jammu and Kashmir cricketers